Garden Street Academy is a K-12 independent school located in Santa Barbara, California, United States. Garden Street was founded as a K-6 school in 2002 and was created under the paradigm that a focus on social emotional learning is critical to academic achievement. Within two years, the Middle School program was added, followed by the Upper School in 2005. The campus offers classes on a historic site on the Upper Eastside of Santa Barbara, encompassing eleven acres (4.5 hectares). Classes range from 10-20 students with an approximate student-teacher ratio of 8:1.

Brief history of locations

Garden Street Academy began in 2002 under the name San Roque School, located at 3214 Calle Cedro in the San Roque neighborhood of Santa Barbara.  It began on a site where a Catholic school of that same name had existed since 1936. The original San Roque School was for families who were parishioners at the Santa Barbara Mission. When that Catholic school (known at the time as St. Anthony's Seminary) was faced with closing its doors in 2002, the founder of Garden Street Academy made an offer to continue the use of the site as a K-6 educational institution that would offer an optional Catholic education class in honor of the history of the site. An arrangement was made and Garden Street Academy operated a non-denominational, independent elementary and then middle school there for nearly a decade, until the present location on Garden Street became available for purchase.
 
In an interesting twist of fate, the historic site on Garden Street was the original home of San Roque Catholic School, which began there in early 1900s before its move to the site at 3214 Calle Cedro in the San Roque neighborhood. 
 
In 2011, Garden Street Academy moved its entire K-12 program to 2300 Garden Street, where it has its own campus on Mission Creek, adjacent to the Santa Barbara Mission and Natural History Museum.

Service learning and internships

Part of the curriculum includes an internship program with local agencies, businesses and non-profits, including the University of California at Santa Barbara, the Santa Barbara Natural History Museum, the Unity Shoppe, law offices and architectural firms, among many other organizations. Upper School students are required to participate in these activities each Wednesday, for 5–6 hours during the school day. As a result, students receive dynamic, real world experiences during school hours. In conjunction with this internship program is a requirement for Upper School students to complete 200 hours of community service work during the fours years prior to graduation.

Garden street athletics

At Garden Street Academy, Lower, Middle and Upper School students have sports opportunities with or against other local private schools including Track and Field, Girls Volleyball, Boys/Girls Basketball and Boys/Girls Soccer. The Upper School has a collaborative relationship with another small school in the city for CIF (California Interscholastic Federation) sports including Boys Basketball, Girls Volleyball and Boys Soccer. Lower and Middle School sports teams have an inclusive policy and all students are encouraged to play.

Garden street arts

Performing Arts 
Garden Street has performed a number of plays/musicals since it opened. Every year, there is one major production for each of the groups from Lower School through Upper School. The Dramatic Arts Director ensures that the choice of plays is a collaborative process so that every student is afforded an opportunity to participate. Students work in fashion design to create their own costumes, in set design to build their own sets, in music to perform their own songs and have also written some of their own plays in the past.

Other facts

The tuition is $15,000 a year for the Lower School, $16,000 a year for the Middle School and $17,000 for the Upper School, which is approximately mid-range for private schools in Santa Barbara. To encourage a diverse group of families to join the Garden Street community, financial aid is available. All of the high school graduates have attended or are currently attending college.

External links
Garden Street Academy website

Private elementary schools in California
Private middle schools in California
Educational institutions established in 1928
Buildings and structures in Santa Barbara, California
1928 establishments in California